The Barrackville Covered Bridge spans  in a single span across Buffalo Creek near Barrackville, West Virginia. Built in 1853 by local bridge builder Lemuel Chenoweth, the structure is a modified arched Burr truss, with siding added twenty years after the bridge's construction.

It was listed on the National Register of Historic Places in 1981.

See also
Philippi Covered Bridge, also built by Chenoweth
List of bridges documented by the Historic American Engineering Record in West Virginia
List of West Virginia covered bridges

References

External links

Bridges completed in 1853
National Register of Historic Places in Marion County, West Virginia
Transportation in Marion County, West Virginia
Tourist attractions in Marion County, West Virginia
Covered bridges on the National Register of Historic Places in West Virginia
Wooden bridges in West Virginia
Historic American Engineering Record in West Virginia
Buildings and structures in Marion County, West Virginia
Road bridges on the National Register of Historic Places in West Virginia
Burr Truss bridges in the United States